Paracanace is a genus of beach flies in the family Canacidae. All known species are Oriental, Neotropical, or Australasian.

Species
P. aicen Mathis and Wirth, 1978
P. blantoni (Wirth, 1956)
P. cavagnaroi With, 1969
P. hoguei Mathis & Wirth, 1978
P. lebam Mathis & Wirth, 1978
P. maritima (Wirth, 1951)
P. oliveirai (Wirth, 1956)

References

Canacidae
Carnoidea genera